Storm the Gates is the fifteenth studio album by English heavy metal band Venom. It was released by Spinefarm on 14 December 2018.

Track listing

Personnel 
 Cronos – lead vocals, bass
 La Rage – guitars, backing vocals
 Dante – drums, backing vocals

References 

2018 albums
Venom (band) albums